Westfield Group was an Australian shopping centre company that existed from 1960 to 2014, when it split into two independent companies: Scentre Group, which owns and operates the Australian and New Zealand Westfield shopping centre portfolio; and Westfield Corporation, which continued to own and operate the American and European center portfolio.

Westfield Group undertook ownership, development, design, construction, funds/asset management, property management, leasing, and marketing activities. The multinational company was listed on the Australian Securities Exchange and had interests in and operated one of the world's largest shopping centre portfolios with investment interests in 103 shopping centres across Australia, the United States, the Netherlands, the United Kingdom, New Zealand, Italy, France, Sweden, Austria, Germany, Croatia, Poland, Czech Republic and Brazil, encompassing around 23,000 retail outlets and total assets under management in excess of A$63 billion.

History 
The Westfield Group had origins in the western suburbs of Sydney. The first development was named "Westfield Place", and opened in July 1959 in Blacktown. The name Westfield is derived from "west" related to the West Sydney location, and "field" due to having located on subdivided farmland. The centre was opened by John Saunders and Frank Lowy.

The company was floated on the Australian Securities Exchange in 1960 and built another five centres in New South Wales before expanding into Victoria and Queensland in 1966–67. For the first half of 1971, Westfield reported earnings of $886,382.

The expansion into the United States began with the purchase of the Trumbull Shopping Park in Connecticut in 1977, and was followed by three centres in California, Michigan and Connecticut in 1980 and three centres in California, New Jersey] and Long Island, New York in 1986. In 1994 Westfield joined with General Growth and Whitehall Real Estate to purchase 19 centres for US$1 billion. Westfield seems to form clusters of centres on particular cities or within a small number of states. They built considerable holdings on the East Coast and in California before expanding into the Midwest. By 2005, the company owned centres in 15 US states.

In the 1990s, Westfield began a major expansion to New Zealand, where they mostly bought existing shopping centres of the Fletchers company, progressively rebranding them. Only in 2007, with Westfield Albany, did the company open a fully new centre in the country.

On 9 May 2006, Westfield announced the sale of eight United States shopping centres which it deemed to fit outside its strategic plan, to Centro Properties Group.

In April 2012 it was announced that the Westfield Group would sell seven non-core property assets to Starwood Capital Group for A$1 billion and one other property to an undisclosed buyer for A$147 million. The funds would be used to repay debt and invest in businesses offering higher return. The sales were expected to be completed by mid–2012.

In 2015, a group of terrorists wanted to blow up the Westfield London but they were stopped by police. They wanted the bombing to be around the same day as that of the 2005 London attacks anniversary.

Operations

Despite the Westfield Group's asset dimensions, the Westfield Group was strongly controlled by the Lowy Family Group, including non-executive chairman, Frank Lowy, one of its founders. Lowy's two younger sons, Steven and Peter, were joint managing directors.

Australia

Having been established in Australia, with their original premises being at Blacktown, the Westfield Group continued to operate a large number of shopping centres in Australia.

A feature of ticketless parking at Westfield Miranda, Westfield Hurstville, Westfield Bondi Junction and Westfield Doncaster was that SMS alerts were provided for when the shopper's three free hours of parking were about to expire and when the shopper left the centres. This feature was removed in 2016 due to concerns that the system could be used to track the movements of others by giving the wrong car numberplate on registration of the phone number.

United States
Westfield entered the United States market in 1977. In September 2003 the company received $17.3 million as a party in the insurance claim following the terrorist attack on the World Trade Center. On 18 February 2006, the Los Angeles Times reported that Westfield had agreed to acquire 15 stores from Federated Department Stores, all but three in southern California. On 9 May 2006, Westfield sold eight United States shopping centres to Centro Properties Group. As of 2018, Westfield owned 33 malls in the United States.

New Zealand
Westfield entered the New Zealand market in 1997 and acquired an interest in the St Lukes Group portfolio in 1998. Westfield malls became by far the most numerous chain in New Zealand, with six of its 12 centres in Auckland, including their largest development located in Albany. Westfield had NZ$2.8 billion in assets under management in New Zealand. In mid-2012, Westfield sold its 50% share of Westfield Shore City in Takapuna on Auckland's North Shore, now known as Shore City Shopping Centre, and over the next five years sold, or divested itself of its interest in, six of the remaining stores. It now has five stores nationwide, four of them in Auckland.

United Kingdom
As of 2014, before Westfield Corporation was created, Westfield had an interest in two shopping centres in England and Northern Ireland.

By far its most significant asset was Westfield's 50% partnership in the £1.6b Westfield London development in Shepherd's Bush, West London. The development included the construction of a new railway station for the London Overground and Southern services, and a new entrance for the London Underground station.

Westfield owned the Westfield Stratford City and also controlled the Stratford City redevelopment project next to 2012 Olympic park in Stratford in east London, having acquired the 75% of the project that it did not already own.

Westfield was the developer behind the troubled Broadway shopping development in Bradford after acquiring Stannifer in 2004.

On 9 October 2007 Westfield opened the £340m extension and refurbishment of Derby's Eagle Centre, which saw the shopping centre rebranded Westfield Derby. The centre was subsequently sold to Intu in 2014.

Westfield were reviewing plans with the Whitgift Foundation to rebuild the Whitgift Centre in Croydon in South London.

Relationship with tenants 
The Australian Competition & Consumer Commission investigated several disputes between the Westfield Group and its tenants. In 2004 the Commission found Westfield was abusing its market and commercial power in settling disputes with tenants, and forced Westfield to formally undertake to not engage in "Unconscionable conduct and intimidation" of tenants.

Also in Australia, Westfield fee structures and policies were criticised by retailers who operated in centres that had been taken over by the company. Retailers suggested that when centres were acquired there should be more cooperation between the new operators and existing tenants in bringing shops up to the corporate standards of the Westfield Group, and increases in rent (required to operate a shopping centre with high standards of fittings and services) should be staged with the required improvements in fittings.

Relationship with competition

In Liverpool, Australia in 2002, a competing shopping centre was lodged to Liverpool City Council and subsequently built. The centre would be about three kilometres from Westfield Liverpool.

References

External links

 
Shopping center management firms
Companies based in Sydney
Shopping centres in the United Kingdom
Real estate companies of Australia
Companies formerly listed on the Australian Securities Exchange
Defunct companies of Australia
Real estate companies established in 1960
Australian companies disestablished in 2014
Australian companies established in 1960